The 1992 Nigerian Senate election in Kogi State was held on July 4, 1992, to elect members of the Nigerian Senate to represent Kogi State. Ahmed Tijani Ahmed representing Kogi Central, Sunday Awoniyi representing Kogi West and Ahmadu Ali representing Kogi East all won on the platform of the National Republican Convention.

Overview

Summary

Results

Kogi Central 
The election was won by Ahmed Tijani Ahmed of the National Republican Convention.

Kogi West 
The election was won by Sunday Awoniyi of the National Republican Convention.

Kogi East 
The election was won by Ahmadu Ali of the National Republican Convention.

References 

Kog
Kogi State Senate elections
July 1992 events in Nigeria